Zam is a town in the Zam Department of Ganzourgou Province in central Burkina Faso. Zam is the capital of Zam Department and has a population of 1,574.

References

External links
Satellite map at Maplandia.com

Populated places in the Plateau-Central Region
Ganzourgou Province